Rhysida carinulata is a species of centipede in the Scolopendridae family. It is found in Australia and New Guinea, and was first described in 1887 by German entomologist Erich Haase.

Distribution
The species occurs in north-eastern coastal Queensland as well as in New Guinea.

Behaviour
The centipedes are solitary terrestrial predators that inhabit plant litter, soil and rotting wood.

References

 

 
carinulata
Centipedes of Australia
Arthropods of New Guinea
Fauna of Queensland
Animals described in 1887
Taxa named by Erich Haase